Bats Castle is an Iron Age hillfort at the top of a  high hill in the parish of Carhampton south south west of Dunster in Somerset, England.

The site was identified in 1983 after some schoolboys found eight silver-plated coins dating from 102BC to AD350.

It is on the highest point of Gallox Hill. Previously it was known as Caesar's Camp and is possibly associated with Black Ball Camp. Bat's Castle has two stone ramparts and two ditches. The ramparts are damaged in places and the hill fort is partly covered in scrub.

Bat's Castle may once have been known as the legendary fortress Din Draithou, a place also associated with a fortress built or used by the legendary Irish king and raider Crimthann mac Fidaig.

The site is designated as a scheduled monument.

Background

Hill forts developed in the Late Bronze and Early Iron Age, roughly the start of the first millennium BC. The reason for their emergence in Britain, and their purpose, has been a subject of debate. It has been argued that they could have been military sites constructed in response to invasion from continental Europe, sites built by invaders, or a military reaction to social tensions caused by an increasing population and consequent pressure on agriculture. The dominant view since the 1960s has been that the increasing use of iron led to social changes in Britain. Deposits of iron ore were located in different places to the tin and copper ore necessary to make bronze, and as a result trading patterns shifted and the old elites lost their economic and social status. Power passed into the hands of a new group of people. Archaeologist Barry Cunliffe believes that population increase still played a role and has stated "[the forts] provided defensive possibilities for the community at those times when the stress [of an increasing population] burst out into open warfare. But I wouldn't see them as having been built because there was a state of war. They would be functional as defensive strongholds when there were tensions and undoubtedly some of them were attacked and destroyed, but this was not the only, or even the most significant, factor in their construction".

See also
List of hill forts and ancient settlements in Somerset

References

Further reading
 Adkins L and R, 1992. A Field Guide to Somerset Archaeology.
 Burrow E J, 1924. Ancient Earthworks and Camps in Somerset.
 Burrow I, 1981. 'Hillforts and Hilltops 1000 AD', in Aston and Burrow, The Archaeology of Somerset.
 Chadwick, Nora K. (et al.), Studies in the Early British Church. Cambridge University Press. 1958.
 Grinsell L V, 1970. The Archaeology of Exmoor.

Hill forts in Somerset
Exmoor
Iron Age sites in Somerset
Scheduled monuments in West Somerset